The Yuha Buttes are a group of buttes in the Lower Colorado River Valley, in southern Imperial County, California.

Sunrise Butte (elevation 387 ft.) lies 3.5 miles south and rises above California State Route 98, the Yuha Cutoff.

References 

Buttes of California
Mountain ranges of the Lower Colorado River Valley
Mountain ranges of Imperial County, California